M'Clintock is an unincorporated area and railway point in Census division 23 in Northern Manitoba, Canada. The Deer River flows  to the west of M'Clintock.

History
M'Clintock was founded with the building of the Hudson Bay Railway in the third decade of the 20th century. When the originally intended final section line route to Port Nelson was abandoned, the construction of the new route of the final section from Amery north to Churchill, which opened in 1929, led to its founding. M'Clintock lies on the line between the settlements of Back to the south and Belcher to the north.

Transportation
M'Clintock is the site of M'Clintock railway station, served by the Via Rail Winnipeg–Churchill train.

References

Unincorporated communities in Northern Region, Manitoba